A cortical modem is a type of brain machine interface that specifically injects images directly into the visual cortex by way of a direct neural interface (DNI) chip.  The true breakthrough goal lies in the information transfer speed.  Both computers and the human brain can transfer information at incredible speeds, and the real bottleneck in the field of brain-computer interaction is the lack of data transfer speeds between the two.

See also
 Windows Holographic
 Transhumanist

References

Human–computer interaction

User interface techniques
Virtual reality
DARPA projects